Cyperus pedunculosus is a species of sedge that is native to New Guinea and northern Australia.

See also 
 List of Cyperus species

References 

pedunculosus
Plants described in 1874
Flora of New Guinea
Flora of Queensland
Flora of the Northern Territory
Taxa named by Ferdinand von Mueller